Førde Hospital Trust is a health trust which administrates hospitals and institutions in Sogn og Fjordane, Norway, and is owned by Western Norway Regional Health Authority

Førde Health Trust was founded in 2002, and took control of the hospitals and psychiatric institutions from the Sogn og Fjordane County Municipality as part of the national health reforms.

The health trust has responsibility for the common specialist health services in Sogn og Fjordane. There are six clinics and one division, divided into four hospitals and other somatic and psychiatric institutions in Nordfjord, Sunnfjord and Sogn. It also has responsibility for the ambulance service in the county.

In 2005, Førde Hospital Trust had 2300 employees, and a budget of 1.4 billion kroner. The administration takes place as Førde Central Hospital, the largest employer in Sogn og Fjordane.

Hospitals and institutions

 Førde Hospital
 Nordfjord Hospital
 Lærdal Hospital
 Local Hospital at Florø
 Nordfjord Psychiatry Centre (NSP)
 Førde BUP
 Sogndal BUP
 Nordfjord BUP
 Indre Sogn Psychiatry Centre (ISP)
 Youth Psychiatric Health Service (UPH)

External links
Official website

Organisations based in Sogn og Fjordane
Organizations established in 2002
Health trusts of Norway
2002 establishments in Norway